Charles Bunyan Sr. (1869–1922) was an English professional football player and manager active throughout Europe in the late-19th and early-20th centuries.

Personal life
Bunyan was born in Campton. Bunyan had three sons – Charles Jr., Maurice and Ernie – two of whom became professional footballers.

Career

Playing career
Bunyan played as a goalkeeper, and after playing with local sides Old Horns and Spital Olympic, Bunyan played with Chesterfield in 1886, before turning professional with Hyde a year later. He was in goal for Hyde when the club lost 26–0 to Preston North End in the FA Cup in October 1887, a score which remains a record in senior English football.

He played in the Football League with Derby County, Bunyan returned to Chesterfield in 1892. Bunyan was sacked by Chesterfield for a number of misdemeanours – both on and off the pitch – and he played with Ilkeston Town and Heanor Town before returning to League football with Walsall. He moved to New Brompton in 1898, where he was an ever-present for one season before moving on to Newcastle United. He also played as a 'guest' player for Sheffield United.

Coaching career
Bunyan moved to Belgium in 1909 to become coach of Racing Club de Bruxelles, while also assisting with the Belgian national side. He moved to Sweden in 1911 to manage Örgryte IS, before coaching the Swedish national side in time for the 1912 Summer Olympics. Bunyan returned to Belgium in 1912 to manage Standard Liège, and after a brief spell also managing the Belgian national side, his career was interrupted by the First World War, but he returned to Belgium after the war ended to coach Anderlecht.

Bunyan replaced Sylva Brébart as manager of Anderlecht in 1922, but died 10 months later and was replaced by his son, Charles.

References

1869 births
1922 deaths
English footballers
English football managers
Chesterfield F.C. players
Sheffield United F.C. players
Derby County F.C. players
Ilkeston Town F.C. (1880s) players
Heanor Town F.C. players
Walsall F.C. players
Gillingham F.C. players
Newcastle United F.C. players
English Football League players
Örgryte IS managers
Expatriate football managers in Sweden
Standard Liège managers
English expatriate football managers
Expatriate football managers in Belgium
Belgium national football team managers
Hyde United F.C. players
R.S.C. Anderlecht managers
Middlesex Regiment soldiers
British Army personnel of World War I
Association football goalkeepers